"Good Goodbye" is a song  written and recorded by Canadian country music artist Dean Brody. It was the lead single off his extended play Black Sheep.

Background
Brody wrote the song about spending the last few hours of a vacation in Mexico before catching a flight.

Critical reception
Front Porch Music said the track "exudes Dean Brody’s typical style", noting influences of mariachi and Caribbean music. They called it a great song and something to enjoy "on the patio all Summer long".

Commercial performance
"Good Goodbye" reached a peak of number 6 on the Billboard Canada Country chart dated September 1, 2018. It also charted at #40 on Hot Canadian Digital Song Sales for the week of June 9, 2018. The song has been certified Gold by Music Canada.

Charts

Certifications

References

Songs about parting
2018 songs
2018 singles
Dean Brody songs
Songs written by Dean Brody
Open Road Recordings singles